Barbara Paul Robinson is a New York City lawyer with the firm Debevoise & Plimpton who specializes in Trusts and Estates law, and is a former president of the New York City Bar Association.

Education

Robinson received her Bachelor of Arts degree from Bryn Mawr College (magna cum laude with honors) and her Juris Doctor from Yale Law School, where she was an editor of the Yale Law Journal and a member of the Order of the Coif.

Career

Robinson joined the firm Debevoise & Plimpton in 1966, and became the firm's first woman partner in 1976 and later head of the firm's Trusts and Estates division. In 1967, she established Debevoise's flextime program for child-rearing attorneys, the first of its kind in New York. Among her clients, she has advised a number of wealthy individuals and organizations on trust law, including Yale University, Princeton University, and the Ford Foundation.

In addition to her private practice work, from 1994 to 1996 Robinson served as the first female president of the New York City Bar Association, where she contributed to the publication of a study entitled “Glass Ceilings and Open Doors” which shows the difficulty large law firms encounter in retaining female lawyers.

While on sabbatical from Debevoise & Plimpton, Robinson worked as a gardener for Rosemary Verey, at Barnsley House in Gloucestershire, England, and then for Penelope Hobhouse at the National Trust Garden, Tintinhull in Somerset; experiences she found life-transforming.  She has written a biography of Rosemary Verey, published by David R. Godine, Rosemary Verey: The Life and Lessons of a Legendary Gardener, which has been widely and favorably reviewed.  Michael Dirda of The Washington Post called it an “irresistible biography.” In addition, she has published articles in The New York Times, Horticulture, Fine Gardening and Hortus, as well as a chapter in Rosemary Verey's The Secret Garden.

A frequent speaker for many organizations, Robinson serves on the boards of Wave Hill, Stonecrop and is Director Emeritus and former Vice President of The Garden Conservancy.   Her own extensive gardens called Brush Hill in northwestern Connecticut were developed with her artist-husband, Charles Raskob Robinson, over the past 40 years.   Brush Hill is open to the public as part of the Garden Conservancy's Open Days Program and by appointment to numerous groups; it has been featured on HGTV's “A Gardener’s Diary”.

Robinson has served on the board of a number of institutions, including the Trust Advisory Board of Fiduciary Trust International, the Foundation for Childhood Development, Teagle foundation, The William Nelson Cromwell Foundation, Panaphil and Uphill Foundations and on the board and Secretary of The John A. Hartford Foundation. Robinson is a member of the Council on Foreign Relations.

Robinson is a Trustee Emeritus of Bryn Mawr College and served as President of the Board of Trustees of Trinity School.

References

Sources
Biography of Barbara Paul Robinson at Debevoise & Plimpton
American Lawyer Lifetime Achievers Award, 2008
American Bar Association Women Trailblazers Project    
More information and a tour of her own gardens in northwestern Connecticut.
Washington Post article
David R. Godine
NPR Interview

Living people
Bryn Mawr College alumni
Yale Law School alumni
New York (state) lawyers
Presidents of the New York City Bar Association
People associated with Debevoise & Plimpton
Year of birth missing (living people)